Martin Wheelahan (8 April 1908 – 7 April 1969) was an Australian rules footballer who played with South Melbourne in the VFL during the early 1930s.

His brother Danny also played for South Melbourne.

References

External links

1908 births
1969 deaths
Australian rules footballers from Victoria (Australia)
Sydney Swans players
Place of birth missing